Clifford George Bond (born February 23, 1948) is a retired American Ambassador to Bosnia and Herzegovina in 2001–2004 and as Special Envoy for Srebrenica in 2007–2008.  He was also Chargé d'Affaires, a.i. in Estonia.

Bond earned an undergraduate degree from Georgetown University's School of Foreign Service and a M.Sc. degree in economics from the London School of Economics.  He also attended the National War College.  He is married to Michele Thoren Bond.

References

1948 births
Living people
Ambassadors of the United States to Bosnia and Herzegovina
Walsh School of Foreign Service alumni
Alumni of the London School of Economics
Ambassadors of the United States to Estonia
National War College alumni
21st-century American diplomats